The 2019–20 Indiana Hoosiers men's basketball team represented Indiana University in the 2019–20 NCAA Division I men's basketball season. Their head coach was Archie Miller, his third year as Indiana head coach. The team played its home games at Simon Skjodt Assembly Hall in Bloomington, Indiana, as a member of the Big Ten Conference. The season officially kicked off with the annual event, Hoosier Hysteria, on October 5, 2019.

The Hoosiers started off another strong campaign by going 11–1 before dropping back-to-back games in late December 2019 and early January 2020. During the bulk of the conference season, IU was able to win most of their home games (7-3), while stealing a few road games (2-8) to end their final season with an overall record of 20–12 and a conference record of 9–11. Indiana entered the Big Ten tournament as the 11-seed where they faced the 14-seeded Nebraska Cornhuskers. The first round matchup ended in an 89–64 IU victory, staging a second round matchup with 6-seed Penn State. However, on the morning of March 12, 2020, the Big Ten Conference announced that it would be cancelling the remaining tournament games due to the COVID-19 pandemic. Following suit, that afternoon, the NCAA announced that it was cancelling all winter and spring championships. This announcement officially, and abruptly, ended the Hoosiers' season, where they were expected to make the NCAA tournament for the first time in 4 years.

Previous season
Despite getting off to a strong start of 12–2, which included 3 conference wins, IU struggled mightily down the backstretch of the season. Riddled with injuries and the inability to shoot, the Hoosiers lost 12 of 13 games before turning things around and finishing the regular season with a 4-game winning streak. Having put themselves back into the conversation for making the NCAA Tournament for the first time in 3 years, the Hoosiers looked to knock off Ohio State in the Big Ten tournament. With a win, many bracketologists had IU safely in the field. However, the Hoosiers fell short and lost to Ohio State, 75–79. IU was deemed one of the Last Four Out in the NCAA Tournament, so they earned 1-seed in the NIT, where they advanced to the Quarterfinals before losing to Wichita State, 63–73. Thus, the Hoosiers 119th season ended with an overall record of 19–16 and 8–12 in the Big Ten.

Offseason

Departures

Recruiting class

Future recruits

2020–21 team recruits

Roster

Depth chart

Schedule and results

|-
!colspan=12 style=| Exhibition

|-
!colspan=12 style=| Regular Season

|-
!colspan=12 style=| Big Ten tournament

Player statistics

Rankings

*AP does not release post-NCAA Tournament rankings

See also
2019–20 Indiana Hoosiers women's basketball team

References

Indiana Hoosiers men's basketball seasons
Indiana
Indiana
Indiana